The following is a list of official symbols of the U.S. state of Nebraska, listed in the order adopted by the Nebraska Legislature:

State symbols

See also
List of Nebraska-related topics
Lists of United States state insignia
State of Nebraska

References

External links
Nebraska's State Symbols (PDF)
Official Symbol and Slogan for the State of Nebraska

State symbols
Nebraska